Perfect Strangers is a 2016 Italian comedy-drama film directed by Paolo Genovese. It was released in Italy on 11 February 2016.

The film was a critical and commercial success, winning the David di Donatello in the Best Film Category and grossing more than €16 million in Italy. It has been remade in more than 20 countries.

Plot
On the evening of a total eclipse of the moon, seven close friends gather for a dinner party. Early in the meal, one of the friends, a relationship therapist named Eva, says that she is convinced that many couples would separate if they saw the messages on each other's phones. As the friends debate this contention, they agree—some of them reluctantly—to play a game. They will each place their phone on the table and they will share their messages and calls with the rest of the group.

At first, the game seems harmless; no one has anything to hide. Gradually, the calls and messages become more compromising. They reveal that one married woman is having an affair and that a man who has been pretending to have an absent girlfriend is not who he seems. As the calls continue, the network of lies and secrets becomes increasingly tangled. Almost no one at the table is spared. By the end of the night, the group's friendships, marriages, and romances have been shattered.

As the guests leave the apartment, they behave as if nothing has happened. Each of their relationships are exactly as they were at the start of the evening. The game never happened.

Cast
 Giuseppe Battiston as Peppe
 Anna Foglietta as Carlotta
 Marco Giallini as Rocco
 Edoardo Leo as Cosimo
 Valerio Mastandrea as Lele
 Alba Rohrwacher as Bianca
 Kasia Smutniak as Eva
 Benedetta Porcaroli as Sofia

Reception
On Rotten Tomatoes, it has an approval rating of 77% based on reviews from 13 critics. It grossed $31.6 million at the box office.

Accolades

Remakes
 
, remakes were underway in Qatar and Sweden.

In February 2017, The Weinstein Company acquired the rights to an English-language remake. In December 2019, Issa Rae was announced to write and star in the US remake. Rae will produce the film along with Spyglass Media Group, a subsidiary of Lantern Entertainment, which acquired the assets of The Weinstein Company after its bankruptcy.

References

External links
 
 
 

2016 films
2016 comedy-drama films
Films directed by Paolo Genovese
Films shot in Rome
Italian comedy-drama films
2010s Italian-language films